David Akinluyi (born 10 February 1984, in Ilesa, Nigeria) is a rugby union footballer who played on the wing for the Northampton Saints.

Career
Akinluyi played rugby while a pupil at St Olave's Grammar School and then at the University of Cambridge. He scored a try for Cambridge in the Varsity Match against Oxford in 2005.

Although not unusual for an ex-professional to play in a varsity match, Akinluyi was controversially picked to play for Cambridge in the December 2006 fixture despite the fact that he was a full-time professional. He was, however, removed from the team sheet the afternoon before the game.  His younger brother Didi Akinluyi played for Cambridge in the U21 varsity game that year 

Due to a variety of injuries he left Northampton in 2007 without ever making his full debut 
Since then he has joined Oliver Wyman, a management consultancy specialising in the financial sector.

He played for Old Olavians RFC from 2007-9 before joining the Birmingham and Solihull Bees on a non-contract basis for the 2009/2010.

He has been selected in the Help for Heroes squad for the 2009 Middlesex Sevens (as David Akinlui) 

He is in the 2009/2010 England Sevens Training Squad 

He is the current Captain of the Nigerian national team.

References

External links
Northampton Saints Rugby Club
Cambridge University Rugby Club
CURFC Varsity 2005 match report
Didi's profile at CURFC
Saints part company with three players

1984 births
Living people
Northampton Saints players
Cambridge University R.U.F.C. players
People educated at St Olave's Grammar School
Yoruba sportspeople
Nigerian emigrants to the United Kingdom
People from Ilesha
Rugby union wings